Addicted to Love may refer to:

 "Addicted to Love" (song), a song by Robert Palmer
 "Addicted to Love", a 2010 song by Ultra featuring Dappy and Fearless
 Addicted to Love (film), a 1997 movie named after the song
 Addicted to Love (TV series), a 2008 co-production drama

See also
Addicted to Your Love (disambiguation)
Addicted to You (disambiguation)